Jakes Run is a stream in the U.S. state of West Virginia. It is a tributary of Dunkard Creek.

Jakes Run was named after Jacob Statler, a pioneer settler.

See also
List of rivers of West Virginia

References

Rivers of Monongalia County, West Virginia
Rivers of West Virginia